Linga is a very small uninhabited island in the Bluemull Sound, Shetland, Scotland. It is one of many islands in Shetland called Linga. It has an area of 45 ha and is 26m at its highest point.

Geography and geology
Linga is made up of "coarse mica-schist and gneiss".

It is separated from Yell by Linga Sound, and Unst is to the north east. Sound Gruney, Urie Lingey are to the south east, and Hascosay to the south.

There is little freshwater on the island.

History

It is said that Jan Tait of Fetlar once kept a bear on the island, and this is commemorated in the placename - "Bear's Bait". It was said to be from Norway, where he had been taken for trial for murder, but he was pardoned for capturing this particular bear, which had been causing problems over there.

An abandoned chapel is located on the island. An unknown duke once planned to build a large house there after buying land on it. However this was cancelled as doctors and other services refused to provide a service to such a small remote island.

On 19 July 1923, the SS Jane ran aground on the island. The 840-ton ship, carrying herring from Baltasound, Unst to Lerwick, later sank into 20m of water just off the island.

There is also the remains of a sheep fold in the north.

Wildlife
Surprisingly for an island whose name derives from the Norse for "heather isle", very little grows here.

Otters, guillemots and seals breed on the island.

Footnotes

Uninhabited islands of Shetland